Buxton may refer to:

Places
Australia
Buxton, Victoria
Buxton, New South Wales
County of Buxton, a cadastral unit in South Australia
Bulgaria
Buxton, Sofia

Canada
South Buxton, Ontario
Buxton National Historic Site and Museum, Ontario

Guyana
Buxton, Guyana

Jamaica
Buxton, Jamaica, a Free Village in Trelawny

Seychelles
Mont Buxton

United Kingdom
Buxton, Derbyshire
Buxton, Norfolk

United States of America
Buxton, Iowa, a historic African-American coal mining camp
Buxton, Kansas
Buxton, Maine
Buxton, Mississippi
Buxton, Montana
Buxton, North Carolina
Buxton, North Dakota
Buxton, Oregon
Buxton Park Arboretum, Indianola, Iowa

People
Buxton (surname), a surname, and a list of people with the surname
Buxton Orr, a composer

Brands and enterprises
Buxton Blue, a type of cheese
Buxton, a bottled mineral water produced by Nestlé, whose source is in Buxton, Derbyshire

Education
 Buxton & Leek College
 Buxton School (disambiguation)
 Buxton University

Other uses

Buxton Festival, an annual arts festival held in Buxton
Buxton Hitmen, a speedway team
Buxton's jird, a species of rodent
 DR DOS "Buxton", the code-name of Digital Research's DR DOS 6.0
Buxton the Blue Cat, a character in the film Dougal and the Blue Cat
Buxton & Lewis, a British mountain classification

See also
Buckston (disambiguation)